The 1987–88 Wisconsin Badgers men's basketball team represented the University of Wisconsin as a member of the Big Ten Conference during the 1987–88 NCAA Division I men's basketball season.

Awards and honors 
Trent Jackson - Third Team All-Big Ten (UPI)

Roster 

 

 

 *academically ineligible second semester

Schedule and results 

|-
!colspan=9 style=| Non-conference regular season
|-

|-
!colspan=9 style=| Big Ten regular season

Player statistics

References

Wisconsin Badgers men's basketball seasons
Wisconsin
Wisconsin Badgers men's basketball
Wisconsin Badgers men's basketball